Dominic Walter is a competitive swimmer from Jamaica.

References

External links 
 The record page for the Amateur Swimming Association of Jamaica
 Walter's Jamaican swimming biography

Living people
1992 births
Jamaican male swimmers
Commonwealth Games competitors for Jamaica
Swimmers at the 2014 Commonwealth Games